It's a Hit is an American children's show that aired on CBS on Saturday mornings from June 1, 1957 to September 21, 1957. The show was hosted by Happy Felton.

Summary
The show combined baseball and a quiz in which two teams of children were coached by sports figures to answer questions about what they were learning in school.
Examples of sports figures are Harvey Kuenn (Detroit Tigers) and Bobby Shantz (Philadelphia Athletics).

References

CBS original programming
1957 American television series debuts
1957 American television series endings
1950s American children's television series
Black-and-white American television shows